

Incumbents
 Resident: Dr. John Crawfurd

Events

March
 17 March - The Anglo-Dutch Treaty of 1824 was signed by Great Britain and the Netherlands.

August
 2 August - The Treaty of Friendship and Alliance in Singapore was signed. The sultans of Johor cedes Singapore and its islands 10 geographical miles away from it to the British East India Company

See also
 List of years in Singapore
 Anglo-Dutch Treaty of 1824

References

 
Singapore
Years in Singapore